Rangiroa Airport is an airport on the island of Rangiroa, French Polynesia . The airport is located on the northwestern edge of the atoll, 5.5 km southeast of Avatoru. The airport was built in 1965. Air Tahiti has regular daily flights connecting Rangiroa to other islands of French Polynesia. In 2018, 89,122 passengers utilized the airport.

Airlines and destinations

Passenger

Accidents and incidents
On February 19, 1985, a UTA DC-10 operating from Los Angeles to Auckland via Tahiti made an emergency landing at Rangiroa following a telephoned bomb threat. Passengers and luggage were removed and flown to Tahiti onboard French military aircraft. The aircraft was searched and no bomb was found. The aircraft was flown empty to Tahiti a week later.

Statistics

References

External links
 Rangiroa Airport
 
 Photograph of Rangiroa Airport terminal and control tower From Airliners.net. Retrieved 14 February 2010.

Airports in French Polynesia